David Reeves Boggs (June 17, 1950 – February 19, 2022) was an American electrical and radio engineer who developed early prototypes of Internet protocols, file servers, gateways, network interface cards and, along with Robert Metcalfe and others, co-invented Ethernet, the most popular family of technologies for local area computer networks.

Biography
David Boggs was born in Washington, D.C. to James Boggs and Jane (McCallum) Boggs on June 17, 1950. He graduated from Woodrow Wilson High School in Washington, D.C. in 1968 and subsequently attended Princeton University, from where he graduated with a B.S.E. in electrical engineering in 1972. He then joined the Xerox PARC research staff, where he met Robert Metcalfe while the latter was debugging an Interface Message Processor interface for the PARC systems group.
Since Boggs had considerable experience as an amateur radio operator WA3DBJ, he recognized similarities between Metcalfe's theories and radio broadcasting technologies and joined his project. According to The Economist, "the two would co-invent Ethernet, with Mr Metcalfe generating the ideas and Mr Boggs figuring out how to build the system."

Throughout 1973, they built several Ethernet interfaces for the Xerox Alto pioneering personal computer. Xerox filed a patent application on March 31, 1975, naming Metcalfe, Boggs, Chuck Thacker, and Butler Lampson as inventors.
They published "Ethernet: Distributed Packet Switching for Local Computer Networks," Ethernet's seminal paper, in 1976, following 18 months of work.
It was reprinted in the Communications of the ACM in a special 25th anniversary issue. He produced a slide from a Metcalfe sketch of Ethernet terminology for a session at the National Computer Conference in June 1976, which was widely reprinted.
The Smithsonian Institution's National Museum of American History presently has the original prototype circuit.

Boggs went to Stanford University for graduate study while working at Xerox, earning a master's degree in 1973 and a Ph.D. in 1982 in electrical engineering. He wrote his dissertation on "Internet Broadcasting", a concept which Steve Deering, also at Stanford, later expanded upon to IP multicasting.

He was a fellow of the Association for Computing Machinery and received the IEEE Computer Society technical achievement award in 1988.
He was also one of the developers of the PARC Universal Packet protocol architecture.

Boggs worked on the "Titan" project at the Digital Equipment Corporation Western Research Laboratory (DECWRL) after leaving Xerox.
He worked as a consultant in Silicon Valley and co-founded LAN Media Corporation (LMC) with Ron Crane.
In July 2000, LMC was acquired by SBE Incorporated and then SBE was acquired by Neonode in 2007.

Boggs died of heart failure at Stanford University Medical Center in Stanford, California, on February 19, 2022, at the age of 71.

References

1950 births
2022 deaths
20th-century American engineers
Amateur radio people
American electrical engineers
Digital Equipment Corporation people
Fellows of the American Association for the Advancement of Science
Fellows of the Association for Computing Machinery
Internet pioneers
Engineers from Washington, D.C.
Princeton University School of Engineering and Applied Science alumni
Scientists at PARC (company)
Stanford University School of Engineering alumni
Woodrow Wilson High School (Washington, D.C.) alumni
21st-century American engineers